Eccellenza Abruzzo is the regional Eccellenza football division for clubs in Abruzzo, Italy. It is competed amongst 18 teams and the winner is promoted to Serie D (usually to Girone F). The clubs that finishes between the second and the fifth place also have a chance to gain promotion. The winner of the regional play-off is entered into a national round which consists of two matches.

Champions

1991–92 Termoli
1992–93 Nereto
1993–94 Paganica
1994–95 Pineto
1995–96 Ortona
1996–97 Luco dei Marsi
1997–98 Lanciano
1998–99 Pro Vasto
1999–2000 Morro d'Oro
2000–01 Pro Vasto
2001–02 Rosetana
2002–03 Celano
2003–04 Guardiagrele
2004–05 Renato Curi Angolana
2005–06 Santegidiese
2006–07 Cologna Paese
2007–08 Chieti
2008–09 Miglianico & L'Aquila Calcio
2009–10 Teramo
2010–11 San Nicolò
2011–12 Amiternina
2012–13 Sulmona
2013–14 San Nicolò
2014–15 Avezzano
2015–16 Vastese
2016–17 Nerostellati
2017–18 Real Giulianova
2018–19 Chieti
2019–20 Castelnuovo Vomano
2020–21 Chieti
2021–22 Avezzano

Notes
L'Aquila also awarded promotion due to its inability to complete the league following the 2009 L'Aquila earthquake; the club was topping the league with Miglianico after Week 32, but was exempted from playing last two games

References

 
Abr
Sports leagues established in 1991
1991 establishments in Italy
Football clubs in Italy
Association football clubs established in 1991